Barre Center is a hamlet in the town of Barre in Orleans County, New York, United States.

The Skinner-Tinkham House was listed on the National Register of Historic Places in 2004.

References

Hamlets in New York (state)
Hamlets in Orleans County, New York